Counties 2 Surrey is a level 8 English Rugby Union League. It is made up of teams predominantly from Surrey and south-west London. Teams play home and away matches from September through to April.  Promoted teams move up to Counties 1 Surrey/Sussex while relegated teams drop down to Counties 3 Surrey.  It was previously known as Surrey 2 and a 10 team team league prior to the RFU Adult Competition Review.

Each year some of the clubs in this division also take part in the RFU Junior Vase - a level 9-12 national competition.

Teams for 2022-23

Teams for 2021-22

The teams competing in 2021-22 achieved their places in the league based on performances in 2019–20, the 'previous season' column in the table below refers to that season not 2020–21.

Season 2020–21

On 30 October the RFU announced that a decision had been taken to cancel Adult Competitive Leagues (National League 1 and below) for the 2020/21 season meaning Surrey 2 was not contested.

Teams for 2019-20

Teams for 2018-19

Teams for 2017-18

Teams for 2016-2017
Bec Old Boys (promoted from Surrey 3)
Cranleigh
Economicals
Kingston (relegated from Surrey 1)	
Old Blues
Old Caterhamians
Old Paulines (relegated from Surrey 1)
Old Walcountians
Streatham-Croydon R.F.C. (promoted top from Surrey 3)
Worth Old Boys

Teams for 2015-2016
Cranleigh
Croydon
Economicals
Guildfordians
Old Amplefordians	
Old Blues
Old Caterhamians
Old Georgians (promoted from Surrey 3)
Old Walcountians
Worth Old Boys (promoted from Surrey 3)

Teams for 2014-2015
Cranleigh	
Croydon
Economicals	
Guildfordians	(promoted from Surrey 3)
Old Amplefordians
Old Blues (relegated from Surrey 1)	
Old Caterhamians (promoted from Surrey 3)	
Old Emanuel
Old Freemans (relegated from Surrey 1)
Old Walcountians (relegated from Surrey 1)

Teams for 2013-2014
Bec Old Boys
Chipstead	
Croydon
Economicals	
Law Society	
Old Amplefordians
Old Emanuel	
Old Rutlishians 	
Stretham Croydon
Worth Old Boys

Teams for 2012-2013
Battersea Ironsides
Bec Old Boys
Chipstead	
CL London	
Law Society	
Old Emanuel	
Old Rutlishians 	
Old Tonbridgians
Stretham Croydon
Worth Old Boys

Original teams
When league rugby began in 1987 this division was split into two groups (Surrey 2A and Surrey 2B) containing the following teams:

Surrey 2A
Charing Cross & Westminster Hospitals
Chobham
Effingham
Kingston
Old Freemens
Old Haileyburians
Old Reedonians
Raynes Park
Shene Old Grammarians
Weybridge Vandals
Wimbledon

Surrey 2B
Bec Old Boys
Chipstead
King's College Hospital
Merton
Mitcham
Old Bevonians
Old Epsomians
Old Johnians
Old Pelhamians
Old Suttonians
Old Wandsworthians
Shirley Wanderers

Surrey 2 honours

Surrey 2A / 2B (1987–1989)

The original Surrey 2 was tier 9 league, split into two groups (Surrey 2A, Surrey 2B), with promotion up to Surrey 1 and relegation down to Surrey 3.

Surrey 2 (1989–1993)

Surrey 2A and 2B were merged into a single division called Surrey 2.  It remained a tier 9 league, with promotion to Surrey 1 and relegation to Surrey 3.

Surrey 2 (1993–1996)

The creation of National 5 South meant that Surrey 2 dropped from a tier 9 league to a tier 10 league for the years that National 5 South was active.  Promotion and relegation continued to Surrey 1 and Surrey 3 respectively.

Surrey 2 (1996–2000)

The cancellation of National 5 South at the end of the 1995–96 season meant that Surrey 2 reverted to being a tier 9 league.  Promotion and relegation continued to Surrey 1 and Surrey 3 respectively.

Surrey 2 (2000–2009)

The introduction of London 4 South West ahead of the 2000–01 season meant Surrey 2 dropped to become a tier 10 league.  Promotion and relegation continued to Surrey 1 and Surrey 3 respectively.

Surrey 2 (2009–present)

Surrey 2 remained a tier 10 league despite national restructuring by the RFU.  Promotion and relegation continued to Surrey 1 and Surrey 3 respectively.

Number of league titles

Old Amplefordians (3)
Croydon (2)
Harrodians
Law Society (2)
Old Blues (2)
Old Cranleighans (2)
Purley John Fisher (2)
Battersea Ironsides (1)
Bec Old Boys (1)
Chipstead (1)
CL London (1)
Cobham (1)
Effingham (1)
Kingston (1)
London Cornish (1)
London Exiles (1)
Merton (1)
Old Caterhamians (1)
Old Freemens (1)
Old Tiffinians (1)
Old Wellingtonians (1)
Old Whitgiftian (1)
Raynes Park (1)
Reeds Weybridge (1)
Shirley Wanderers (1)
Teddington (1)
Wimbledon (1)

Notes

See also
London & SE Division RFU
Surrey RFU
English rugby union system
Rugby union in England

References

External links
Surrey Rugby Football Union

S
Rugby union in Surrey